Villafranchian age is a period of geologic time (3.5–1.0 Ma) spanning the Late Pliocene and Early Pleistocene used more specifically with European Land Mammal Ages. Named by Italian geologist Lorenzo Pareto for a sequence of terrestrial sediments studied near Villafranca d'Asti, a town near Turin, it succeeds the Ruscinian age, and is followed by the Galerian.

The Villafranchian is sub-divided into six faunal units based on the localities of Triversa, Montopoli, Saint-Vallier, Olivola, Tasso and Farnetta.

A major division of both geological deposits and time, the Villafranchian is significant because the earliest hominids that clearly evolved into modern man (the australopithecines) appeared within it. The Villafranchian is partially contemporaneous with the Blancan Stage of North America.

Many animals and their extinct ancestors evolved during the Villafranchian, including the Red fox, Least weasel, Moorhen, Etruscan bear, and Panthera gombaszoegensis.

The beginning of the Villafranchian is typically defined by the first appearance of the bovid genus Leptobos in Italy, dated to around 3.5-3.6 million years ago (mya). The beginning of the Middle Villafranchian is defined by the "elephant–Equus event" denoting the first appearance of Mammuthus meridionalis and Equus stenonis, thought to be around 2.5-2.6 mya. The beginning of the Late Villafranchian was formerly typically defined by the "Wolf event", the first appearance of Canis etruscus , but this was later considered to be diachronous. It was later proposed that the boundary be placed at the first appearance of hyena Pachycrocuta brevirostris approximately 1.8 mya.

References

Piacenzian